Micheline was a series of rubber-tyred trains developed in France in the 1930s by various rail companies and rubber-tyre manufacturer Michelin.

Micheline may also refer to:

People 
 Micheline (given name)
 Jack Micheline (1929–1998), pen-name of Harold Silver, an American painter

Other
 Micheline (liqueur)
"Micheline", a song by Sun Kil Moon from Benji (2014)